Raul Sapena Pastor Guérin (9 October 1908–15 June 1989) was a Paraguayan lawyer, diplomat, professor and judge who served as foreign minister of the Republic of Paraguay from 1956 to 1976.

Family 
He was the youngest of 9 children. His parents were the Spanish Sapena y Pastor and the French Josephine Guérìn Mertens. Ruben Adolfo, Raúl's son, relates the following:

He was president of the Banco de la República del Paraguay (today split into the Central Bank of Paraguay and the Banco de Fomento), also Ambassador in Argentina, and as Ambassador in Brazi. He came as Minister of Foreign Affairs when he was 56 where he worked for 20 years, when he resigned and assumed his seat in the Senate, where he was one of the few senators who worked on the commissions. His work was very important in the drafting of the Civil Code.

It also has important international law books that have been used in various universities throughout Latin America.

Training 
He began his studies at the Normal School of Asunción. In 1924 he completed his Secondary Studies obtaining the Bachelor's Degree in Sciences and Letters, along with the Gold Medal as the best graduate of his class at the Colegio de San José de Asunción.

He continues his studies at the National University of Asunción, the house of studies from which he obtained the title of Doctor of Law and Social Sciences. Where he was also president of the Law Students Center. A few years later he would obtain the title of doctor "Honoris Causa" from the University of Rio de Janeiro, Brazil.

Having just received a Doctor of Law, Paraguay entered into war with Bolivia for possession of the Chaco Territory, and, at the call of his homeland, came to his defence, becoming an officer in the Paraguayan army with the rank of lieutenant.

At the end of the Chaco War, he married Juana Brugada Montero, with whom he lived all his life and had 4 children: Graciela Josefina, Raúl Ricardo, Rubén Adolfo and Gloria Susana.

His first works were done as a Teacher at the Goethe, International and National Schools of the Capital. At the same time he taught Political Economy, Private International Law, Consular Legislation and Public International Law at the Faculty of Law and Social Sciences of the National University of Asunción.

At the War College, he was a professor of Public International Law.

In 1937, he presides over a University Delegation of Professors to Montevideo, Uruguay.

In that same year of 1937, he published his work "The Hereditary Vocation in Intestate Successions" Forensic Study.

At the same time, between 1937 and 1938, he made 100 publications in "La Tribuna" on "American International Conferences"

Judicial functions 
Raúl Sapena Pastor not only dedicated himself to teaching but also held judicial positions, being a First Instance judge in Criminal matters, a First Instance judge in Civil and Commercial matters, the State attorney general, president of the Civil Court of Appeal and Commercial, and, he gets to occupy the maximum position aspired by every magistrate, that of being a member of the Supreme Court of Justice of Paraguay, at that time called Superior Court of Justice.

Ministry of Foreign Affairs and Diplomatic Missions 
His work at the Paraguayan Chancellery can be divided into 2 sections. One prior to the arrival of Gral. Alfredo Stroessner to the presidency of Paraguay, and the other during his presidency in Paraguay, and the installation of the dictatorship. At that point, he resigned from office.

Charges 
1939: Plenipotentiary Delegate and President of the Paraguayan Delegation to the II Congress of Private International Law, Montevideo, Uruguay.
1940: Plenipotentiary Delegate to the Regional Conference of the Silver Countries.
1941: Envoy Extraordinary and Minister Plenipotentiary to the Government of Bolivia.
1942: Plenipotentiary Delegate to the Rivera Conference, Uruguay; Extraordinary envoy and Minister Plenipotentiary to the Government of Uruguay, until 1944; Paraguayan agent before the Emergency Advisory Committee for the Political Defense of the Continent, Montevideo.
1945: Member of the Permanent Court of Arbitration in The Hague
1947: Extraordinary and Plenipotentiary Ambassador, Rio de Janeiro, Brazil.
1948/1949: Extraordinary and Plenipotentiary Ambassador to the Government of the Argentine Republic.
1950: Representative of Paraguay before the Inter-American Council of Jurists, First Meeting, Rio de Janeiro, Brazil.
1952: Delegate of Paraguay to the Fourth Meeting of the Inter-American Conference on Social Security, Mexico.

Legislative Branch 
He was elected Senator of the Republic of Paraguay in three consecutive periods 1973-78 (with permission until 1976), 1978–83, 1983-89. He held his seat in the Senate of the Republic until the date of his death.

Decorations 
Great cross of the Order of Pius IX of the Vatican.
Grand cross of the Order of Merit of Chile.
Grand cross of the Order of the Cruzeiro do Sul in Brazil.
Great cross of the Condor of the Andes of Bolivia.
Great cross of the Order of the Sun of Peru.
Great cross of the Order of Vasco Núñez de Balboa of Panama.
Great cross of the Order of Rubén Darío of Nicaragua.
Great cordon of the Order of the Liberator of Venezuela.
Grand Cross of the Order of the Shining Star of China.
Great cross of the Amador Guerrero Order of Panama.
Grand cross of the Order of Merit of Ecuador.
Great Cross of Orange-Nassau (Netherlands).
Great cross of the Order of Bocayá of Colombia.
Grand Cross of Merit of the Sovereign Order of Malta.
Great cross of the Liberating Order San Martín (Argentina).
Grand cross of the Order of Merit of the Republic of Italy.
Great cross of the Order of Isabel la Católica (Spain).
Elected capitular knight of CC de Toledo.
Knight Commander of the Order of the British Empire.
Marshal Hermes Medal of Brazil.
Mariscal Gaetano de Faría Medal from Brazil.
Medal of the Americas, in the Board degree of the Chamber of C. of L. America.
Great cross of the Order of the Rising Sun, from Japan.
Great Cordon of the Order of Auspicious Clouds of China.
First class decoration of the Order of the Republic of Egypt.

Death 
He died in the City of Asunción, Republic of Paraguay, on 15 June 1989. The then President of the Republic, General Don Andrés Rodríguez Pedotti (1989-1993), and, the Congress of the Republic of Paraguay, decided that, his burial is carried out with the Military Honors corresponding to General of Division, for the high services rendered to the Homeland.

External links

References

1908 births
1989 deaths